Poppie Nongena is a 2019 South African biographical drama film written and directed by award-winning director Christiaan Olwagen. The film is based on an autobiographical novel Die swerfjare van Poppie Nongena (The Long Journey of Poppie Nongena) by Elsa Joubert which is also considered as one of the finest African novels of the twentieth century. The film stars Clementine Mosimane playing the titular role, Anna-Mart van der Merwe and Chris Gxalaba in the lead roles. The film was released on 31 January 2020 and received positive reviews from the critics. It won several awards and nominations in few film festivals. The film won 12 awards in the 2019 Silwerskerm Film Festival including the Best Film Accolade. The record haul of 12 awards is regarded as the highest tally ever recorded for a single film at an Afrikaans film festival.

Synopsis 
The film revolves around Poppie Nongena, an Afrikaans/Xhosa South African whose life revolves around her family and finding stability in a period of immense upheaval in apartheid South Africa where women were forced by arrests. When Poppie's husband Stone becomes too ill to manage and maintain his contract work, Poppie is deemed by the state of law to be an illegal resident of the country.

Cast 

 Clementine Mosimane as Poppie Nongena
 Anna-Mart van der Merwe as Antoinette Swanepoel
 Chris Gxalaba as Stone
 Nomsa Nene as Lena
 Rolanda Marais as Magriet

References

External links 

 
 

2019 films
2019 biographical drama films
South African biographical drama films